"My True Story" is a 1961 single recorded by The Jive Five and co-written by the group's lead singer Eugene Pitt, along with Oscar Waltzer and Joe Rene.

Chart performance
The single was the biggest hit for the group on both the R&B and pop charts. "My True Story" made it to number three on the Billboard Hot 100 and was number one on the R&B Sides chart for three weeks.

References

1961 singles
1961 songs
Doo-wop songs